The Miguel Angel Garcia Mendez Post Office Building in Mayagüez, Puerto Rico, previously known as the United States Post Office and Courthouse, and also known as Correo Central de Mayagüez is a post office and courthouse facility of the United States, housing operations of the United States District Court for the District of Puerto Rico. It was designed by Louis A. Simon, Supervising Architect of the Treasury, and was built in 1935. It  was listed on the National Register of Historic Places in 1986 as U.S. Post Office and Courthouse. In 2007, the U.S. Congress passed a bill renaming the building for statesman and local government figure Miguel A. García Méndez.

Overview
In this same lot stood, since the times of Spanish rule, first the Barracks of the Alfonso XII Regiment until 1898, then the district court and jail until the October 11, 1918 earthquake when the old brick building was destroyed.  The barracks were built in 1848; they were large and had two floors. They could house a battalion of 800 men and its officers. The building's brick roof had 30 lightning rods.

Gallery

See also 
List of United States post offices

References

External links 
Historic Federal Courthouses page from the Federal Judicial Center

Government buildings completed in 1935
Post office buildings on the National Register of Historic Places
Courthouses on the National Register of Historic Places in Puerto Rico
National Register of Historic Places in Mayagüez, Puerto Rico
1935 establishments in Puerto Rico
Government buildings on the National Register of Historic Places in Puerto Rico